Bishop Asbury Cottage is a 17th-century cottage on Newton Road, Great Barr, England, known for being the boyhood home of Francis Asbury (1745 – 1816), one of the first two bishops of the Methodist Episcopal Church (now The United Methodist Church) in the United States. It is now a museum in his memory.

Architecture 
The single-storey cottage, then in Staffordshire, was built  from brick. It has an attic with dormer windows, tiled roof and rendered plinth.

The Asburys 
Asbury was born in nearby Hamstead in 1745 and the family moved to the cottage the next year. Asbury worshipped as a Methodist at nearby Wednesbury. He had an apprenticeship as a blacksmith before becoming a full-time preacher, at the age of 21.

He left for America in 1771, never to return. His family remained at the cottage until the death of his mother Eliza in 1802. During that time, the cottage was used for religious worship. These services continued after the death of Asbury's parents and eventually the cause moved to "The Institute" across the road, which eventually became the Newton Road United Reformed Church which continued until 2017.

Later history 
By the 1950s, the cottage was owned by a brewery, but had no running water and only a cesspit toilet. It was occupied by a Mrs Randles and her daughter Mrs Searle, who often showed visiting American Methodists around the building. The brewery applied for permission to demolish it, but this was refused at the behest of local councillor Mrs Parfitt, a Methodist, once its history became apparent. In around 1955, the cottage was purchased by the local council, who then rehoused the occupants.

The building was part of a terraced pair, but in 1964 the adjacent, southern, cottage was demolished when Newton Road (designated the A4041) was widened. Local legend has it that it was the demolished cottage which was the Asburys', but documentary evidence in Sandwell Museum disproves this.

A Grade II listed building since September 1955, the cottage is now operated as a museum, furnished in period style, with memorabilia and information relating to Asbury's life in West Bromwich and Great Barr in England and later in the United States. It also has displays about the rise of Methodism in the surrounding Black Country, and John Wesley's life and times, and visits to the local area.

See also
Charlemont and Grove Vale

Bibliography
H allam, David J.A. "Eliza Asbury: her cottage and her son" Studley, 2003 
Hallam, David J.A. "One hundred years of service to Newton: The history of Newton Road United Reformed (Allen Memorial) Church 1917-2017 Smethwick, 2018

References

External links
Sandwell MBC - Bishop Asbury Cottage
Bishop Francis Asbury in England

Houses completed in the 17th century
Buildings and structures in Sandwell
Grade II listed buildings in the West Midlands (county)
Asbury
Asbury
Historic house museums in the West Midlands (county)
History of Staffordshire
Great Barr
Cottages